Matheus Seto Nurdiantara (born 14 April 1974) is an Indonesian football coach and former player who is the head coach of Indonesian club PSS Sleman. He represented Indonesia internationally as a midfielder at the 2000 AFC Asian Cup.

Managerial career 
Nurdiantaro began coaching at PSIM Yogyakarta in 2013, remaining at the club until 2015 when he became coach of the Special Region of Yogyakarta (D.I. Yogyarta) Pra PON team. Between 2016 and 2020, he was head coach of PSS Sleman, before returning to PSIM on 29 January 2020. On 31 December 2021, after having failed to gain promotion to the Liga 1, Nurdiantaro announced that he would take a break from football. He returned to coach PSS Sleman in April 2022.

Career statistics

International 

 Scores and results list Indonesia's goal tally first, score column indicates score after each Riyadi goal.

Honours

Player 
PSS Sleman
 Liga Indonesia First Division: 2000

Persiba Bantul
 Liga Indonesia Premier Division: 2010–11

Indonesia
 Tiger Cup runner-up: 2000

Manager 
PSS Sleman
 Liga 2: 2018

Notes

References

External links
 
 

1974 births
Living people
People from Sleman Regency
Indonesian footballers
Association football midfielders
PSS Sleman players
PSIM Yogyakarta players
Pelita Jaya FC players
Indonesian Premier Division players
Indonesia international footballers
Indonesian football managers
PSIM Yogyakarta managers
PSS Sleman managers
Liga 2 (Indonesia) managers
Liga 1 (Indonesia) managers